Michael Minutillo is an American soccer player.

Career 
Minutillo played two years of college soccer at Virginia Tech, before transferring to Penn State University in 2012. He also played in the Premier Development League for IMG Academy Bradenton and San Jose Earthquakes U23.

On March 4, 2015, Minutillo signed with Faroe Islands Premier League side 07 Vestur. He returned to the United States in March 2017, when he signed for United Soccer League club Richmond Kickers.

References 

1991 births
American soccer players
Soccer players from California
Virginia Tech Hokies men's soccer players
Penn State Nittany Lions men's soccer players
IMG Academy Bradenton players
San Jose Earthquakes U23 players
Finn Harps F.C. players
Richmond Kickers players
USL League Two players
USL Championship players
Living people
Association football forwards
De Anza Force players